Spinulata is a genus of moths in the family Cossidae.

Species
 Spinulata acutipennis (Schaus, 1905)
 Spinulata centrosoma (Dyar & Schaus, 1937)
 Spinulata corregis (Dyar & Schaus, 1937)
 Spinulata discopuncta (Schaus, 1901)
 Spinulata julius (Schaus, 1921)
 Spinulata manes (Druce, 1898)
 Spinulata maruga (Schaus, 1901)
 Spinulata oblongata Davis, Gentili-Poole & Mitter, 2008
 Spinulata quasivinnea Davis, Gentili-Poole & Mitter, 2008
 Spinulata rille (Dyar & Schaus, 1937)
 Spinulata ryssa (Dyar & Schaus, 1937)

References

 , 2008, Zoological Journal of the Linnean Society 154: 222-277.

External links

 Natural History Museum Lepidoptera generic names catalog

Cossulinae
Cossidae genera